OMG 2 is an upcoming Indian Hindi language satirical comedy-drama film written and directed by Amit Rai. It is a spiritual sequel to OMG – Oh My God! (2012) and stars Akshay Kumar, Pankaj Tripathi, Yami Gautam and Arun Govil. The film revolves around the subject of Indian education system.

Cast
Akshay Kumar as Lord Shiva
Pankaj Tripathi
Arun Govil as Lord Rama
Yami Gautam as Sanjana Tripathi 
 Govind Namdev

Production

Development and casting
The film was initially rumoured to be in making in January 2021 with Akshay Kumar and Paresh Rawal returning as leads post the first part, but Rawal denied the reports. In June 2021, the sequel to OMG was finally confirmed with a new storyline starring Kumar. Pankaj Tripathi and Yami Gautam were roped in as new additions that same month, while Arun Govil joined the cast in November 2021 as Lord Rama.

Filming
Tripathi began the first schedule of the film on 2 September 2021 in Mumbai. Akshay Kumar joined the sets in second schedule on 23 October 2021. Third schedule of the film commenced in December 2021.

Marketing
First look poster of the film featuring Akshay Kumar as Lord Shiva was launched in October 2021.

References

External links
 

Upcoming Hindi-language films
Upcoming films
2020s Hindi-language films
Hinduism in pop culture-related controversies
Indian comedy-drama films
Films postponed due to the COVID-19 pandemic
Indian satirical films